LeBey is a surname originating in the Normany (Normandie) region of Northern France, the former Duchy of Normandy, where the House of LeBey has been traced since 1204. 

House of LeBey: 

 Motto: Sine Labe
 Motto translation: without wavering

Origin

The House of LeBey is a medieval noble house, originating in (Normandie) region of Northern France. One of the branches of the LeBeys became a Royal House of the Capetian Dynasty, cousins of the Bourbons and the Valois, and achieved the title of Latin Emperor of Constantinople.

Notable people with the surname include:

 Andrew LeBey (1779), one of 6 brothers, who fled France in Count d'Estaing's army to assist the Continental army to take Savannah from the British
 Christian David LeBey and Rosina T Courtenay LeBey, Direct descendant of Carlisle Courtenay, Earl of Devon. 
 John C. LeBey, Architect and preservationist in Savannah, Ga. 

 Claude Lebey (1923–2017), French food critic
 Dummy Lebey (1896–1959), American college football player

See also
 Leber
 Levey